Sean Thornley (born 31 May 1989) is a former British tennis player, best known for playing on the doubles circuit with David Rice.

Career
In 2011 Thornley and Rice qualified for the Men's Doubles at Wimbledon. They lost in the first round to Jamie Murray and Sergiy Stakhovsky, 3–6, 5–7.

After a successful year, Thornley and Rice were awarded a wildcard in 2013 in to the Wimbledon Championships Doubles Main Draw, where they lost in the first round in five sets, 4–6, 3–6, 7–6(7), 6–4, 4–6 to Marinko Matosevic and Frank Moser.

Sean Thornley and David Rice have won 21 international doubles titles together.

Thornley retired from professional tennis in 2015 and now works in the commercial department at Arsenal Football Club.

Challenger and Futures finals

Doubles: 47 (23–24)

References

External links
 
 
 LTA profile

English male tennis players
Tennis people from Bristol
British male tennis players
People from Bromley
1989 births
Living people